This is a list of seasons played by VfL Bochum in German and European football, from 1938 to the present day. It details the club's achievements in major competitions, and the top scorers for each season.

Seasons

Men

Notes

Women

Notes

Key

P = Played
W = Games won
D = Games drawn
L = Games lost
F = Goals for
A = Goals against
Pts = Points
Pos = Final position

References

External links
 Das deutsche Fussballarchiv 1900-heute 
 VfL Bochum at fussballdaten.de 

Seasons
Bochum
Bochum